Churton by Aldford is a former civil parish, now in the parish of Churton, in Cheshire West and Chester, England. It contains seven buildings that are recorded in the National Heritage List for England as designated listed buildings, all of which are at Grade II.  This grade is the lowest of the three gradings given to listed buildings and is applied to "buildings of national importance and special interest".  The parish contained part of the village of Churton, but is otherwise rural.

References

Listed buildings in Cheshire West and Chester
Lists of listed buildings in Cheshire